Shelley Emling is an American journalist. She was born in Missouri. Later she grew up in Dallas, Texas. She went to the University of Texas and started her journalism career at UPI.

Personal life

Shelley met her husband, Scott Norvell in Texas while working at a newspaper, The Corpus Christi Caller-Times. They married in Antigua, Guatemala in 1991 and honeymooned in Colombia. She has three children. She was born in 1965.

Education and career

She was previously a foreign correspondent for Cox Newspapers, covering Latin America for three years and then Europe, from a base in London, for several years. Her work also has appeared in The New York Times, Fortune, USA Today, and the International Herald Tribune. Previously she also was an editor for AOL’s Patch, and lives with her family in Montclair, New Jersey. She has lived in Missouri, Texas, New Orleans, Miami, Guatemala, Atlanta, London, and New York. Previously she also was the senior editor of Huff/Post50, The Huffington Post site for those 50 and older. Currently she is the Executive Editor, Specialized Content, at AARP as well as the editor-in-chief of The Girlfriend and The Ethel newsletters, both from AARP. She also oversees editorial on AARP's brand Instagram account as well as The Girlfriend Book Club.

Published works

Shelley is the author of several books, includingYour Guide to Retiring in Mexico and The Fossil Hunter, published by Macmillan in 2009 about paleontologist Mary Anning, whom Shelley had learned of while on a holiday in England. The Fossil Hunter was criticised by the New York Times for having moved away from the central narrative too often, but the reviewer nevertheless noted the ample footnotes, which put the subject's work "into the scientific and sociological context".  Nature, however, felt that Emling's "diligent" work was "more thorough and complete" than Tracy Chevalier's fictional account of Anning's life, Remarkable Creatures, which was released the same year – although the reviewer notes that the freedom of the fictionalised account proved to be more engaging.

Shelley's book "Marie Curie and Her Daughters: The Private Lives of Science's First Family" was published by Palgrave Macmillan in 2013. http://www.palgrave.com/page/detail/marie-curie-and-her-daughters-shelley-emling/?K=9781137278364

In spring 2016, she published Setting the World on Fire: The Brief, Astonishing Life of St. Catherine of Siena.

Her next book was published in 2019: "A Forgotten Hero: Folke Bernadotte, the Swedish Humanitarian Who Rescued 30,000 People from the Nazis."

References

External links
 Huffington Post articles
 MacMillan Author Page
 Amazon Author Page
 New York Times Review of The Fossil Hunter
 AOL Montclair Patch

Living people
American women journalists
Year of birth missing (living people)
21st-century American women